The Bhutan national under-23 football team represents Bhutan in men's international under-23 football. The team is controlled by the governing body for football in Bhutan, the Bhutan Football Federation, which is currently a member of the Asian Football Federation and the regional body the South Asian Football Federation. Bhutan have never attempted to qualify for the Olympic Games and their competitive matches have been restricted solely to the South Asian Games, where they made their debut in 2004.

History
Bhutan made their debut at the 9th South Asian Federation Games in 2004. The senior national team had previously competed on multiple occasions in the football tournaments of the South Asian Games, but this was the first time that the tournament was restricted to under-23 teams. The tournament was originally scheduled for 2001, but was cancelled due to the conflict in neighbouring Afghanistan. It was rescheduled for 2003, but Bhutan withdrew. This time, due to the war in Iraq, the tournament was postponed for a second time but was rescheduled a second time for 2004, which Bhutan re-entered. Drawn in a three team group including Nepal and Sri Lanka (following the Maldives' withdrawal), an opening 0–0 draw with Nepal was a positive start. With Sri Lanka beating both Bhutan and Nepal 1–0 in the remaining two group games, Bhutan finished with an identical record to Nepal, but progressed to the knockout rounds winning the toss of a coin. A 4–1 loss to India in the semi finals, with Pema Chophel scoring the team's first ever goal, saw them face Sri Lanka again in the bronze medal play off match. This time they produced a better performance drawing 0–0 after sudden death extra time, but ultimately lost 3–2 in the resulting penalty shoot out to finish in fourth place overall.

Their next international fixtures were in the 2006 South Asian Games. This time they were less successful. Drawn in a group with Sri Lanka, Pakistan national under-23 football team and the Maldives, Bhutan were eliminated after losing all three of their games: 1–0 against the Maldives and 4–0 against both Pakistan and Sri Lanka to return home without scoring a goal.

There was a four-year gap this time between editions of the South Asian Games, but Bhutan sent their under-23 team to Bangladesh in 2010. Again they were drawn in a four team group, this time with Bangladesh, Nepal and the Maldives, and again they were eliminated following three consecutive losses: 1–0 versus the Maldives, 4–0 versus Bangladesh and then 2–0 versus Nepal to return home for a second time in a row without scoring a goal.

Bhutan's next, and to date most recent series of matches was in 2016, again at the South Asian Games. This time, they were drawn in a three team group, again playing matches against Bangladesh and Nepal. they lost their first match 5–0 to Nepal, to date their heaviest defeat, though they rallied in their final match to draw 1–1 with Bangladesh, and in doing so score only their second ever goal and their first in twelve years through Jigme Dorji. However, this was not enough to seal progression to the knockout stages as Bangladesh beat Nepal in their final group game to claim second place and Bhutan were eliminated.

Current squad
The following squad was selected for the 2016 South Asian Games:

Coaching staff

Recent results and upcoming fixtures

2016

Competitive record

Asian Games

South Asian Games

International opponents
Last match updated:  on 10 December 2019.

See also

 Bhutan national football team
 Bhutan women's national football team
 Bhutan national under-19 football team
 Bhutan national under-17 football team
 Bhutan national futsal team

References

Asian national under-23 association football teams
under-23